Frederick Sumner Brackett (August 1, 1896 – January 28, 1988), was an American physicist and spectroscopist.

Born in  Claremont, California, to Frank and Lucretia Brackett, he graduated from Pomona College and worked as an observer at Mount Wilson Observatory until 1920. He observed the infra-red radiation of the Sun. Brackett received a doctorate in physics from the Johns Hopkins University in 1922. Applying a hydrogen filled discharge tube, he discovered the hydrogen Brackett series, where an electron jumps up from or drops down to the fourth fundamental level, in 1922.

He then taught physics at the University of California, Berkeley.

He moved to the Washington area and joined the Department of Agriculture's Fixed Nitrogen Lab in 1927.  He transferred to the National Institute of Health (NIH) in 1936 as director of biophysics research.

At NIH, he was a scientist in the Division of Industrial Hygiene, where he developed spectrometers to detect toxic substances in body fluids, including one containing two of the largest natural quartz prisms in the world.

During World War II, he directed a research optics program at the Army. He was promoted to the rank of lieutenant colonel and received the Legion of Merit for his work.

Brackett returned to the NIH as chief of the photobiology section. He retired in 1961.

The lunar crater Brackett was named after him in 1974.  At the time, he was the only living person to have a moon crater named for him.

References

General references 
 Frederick Sumner Brackett, An Examination of the Infra-Red Spectrum of the Sun, lambda 8900 - lambda 9900, Astrophysical Journal, vol. 53, (1921) p. 121; 
 Frederick Sumner Brackett, Visible and Infra-Red Radiation of Hydrogen; Ph.D. dissertation, Johns Hopkins University, 1922
 Frederick Sumner Brackett, Visible and Infra-Red Radiation of Hydrogen; Astrophysical Journal, vol. 56, (1922) p. 154; 
 Frederick Sumner Brackett, Graphic correlation of radiation and biological data, City of Washington, The Smithsonian Institution, 1932, 1 p. l., 7 p. diagrs. 24½ cm
 F. S. Brackett and Earl S. Johnston, The functions of radiation in the physiology of plants, City of Washington, Smithsonian Institution, 1932, 2 v. illus., plates, diagrs. 25 cm.
 The present state of physics; a symposium presented on December 30, 1949, at the New York meeting of the American Association for the Advancement of Science. Arranged by Frederick S. Brackett. Freeport, N.Y., Books for Libraries Press [1970, c1954] vi, 265 p. illus. 24 cm. 
 Dr. John Andraos, Named Concepts in Chemistry (A-K), York University, 2001

1896 births
1988 deaths
20th-century American physicists
Pomona College alumni
Recipients of the Legion of Merit
Spectroscopists
Fellows of the American Physical Society